Joeri is a Dutch transliteration of the Slavic masculine given name Yury (George) and as such a given name in Belgium and the Netherlands since the early 1960s. It is occasionally spelled Joerie.  People with this name include:

Joeri Adams (born 1989), Belgian cyclist
Joeri Calleeuw (born 1985), Belgian cyclist
Joeri Dequevy (born 1988), Belgian footballer
Joeri van Dijk (born 1983), Dutch sailor
Joeri Fransen (born 1981), Belgian pop singer
Joeri de Groot (born 1977), Dutch rower
Joeri Jansen (born 1979), Belgian middle-distance runner
Joeri de Kamps (born 1992), Dutch footballer
Joerie Mes (born 1979), Dutch kickboxer
Joeri Poelmans (born 1995), Belgian footballer
Joeri Schroyen (born 1991), Dutch footballer
Joeri Stallaert (born 1991), Belgian cyclist
 (born 1982), Belgian duathlete and triathlete
Joeri Vastmans (born 1983), Belgian footballer
Joeri Verlinden (born 1988), Dutch swimmer

References

Dutch masculine given names